Domingo Germán Polanco (born August 4, 1992) is a Dominican professional baseball pitcher for the New York Yankees of Major League Baseball (MLB). Germán was signed by the Florida Marlins as an international free agent in 2009. He made his MLB debut in 2017 with the Yankees.

Career

Florida/Miami Marlins
Germán was signed by the then Florida Marlins as an international free agent in 2009. He made his professional debut in 2010 for the Dominican Summer League Marlins. Germán played the 2014 season with the Greensboro Grasshoppers, pitching to a 9–3 win–loss record with a 2.48 earned run average (ERA) and 113 strikeouts. In July he was selected to play in the All-Star Futures Game and recorded two strikeouts in the game.

New York Yankees
On December 19, 2014, the Marlins traded Germán, Nathan Eovaldi, and Garrett Jones to the New York Yankees for Martín Prado and David Phelps. He missed the 2015 season while recovering from Tommy John surgery, and was non-tendered after the season, removing him from the 40-man roster. The Yankees resigned Germán to a minor league contract during the offseason. They re-added him to their 40-man roster after the 2016 season.

The Yankees promoted Germán to the major leagues on June 10, 2017. He made his major league debut the next day against the Baltimore Orioles. Germán pitched  scoreless innings of relief, allowing two hits while walking one and striking out one. In seven relief appearances to finish 2017, German finished with an 0–1 record and a 3.14 ERA.

Germán made his first career MLB start on May 6, 2018, at Yankee Stadium against the Cleveland Indians. He pitched six innings without allowing a hit, allowing two walks and striking out nine batters. Germán was removed after the sixth inning due to his pitch count and not being completely stretched out as a starter yet. Germán became the first pitcher in MLB history with nine or more strikeouts and zero hits allowed in his first MLB start. In 19 games (13 starts), Germán had a 2–6 record and a 5.68 ERA. He was optioned to Triple-A on July 21, 2018. In 2019, Germán made the Yankees' Opening Day roster. He was named 'Hurler of the Month' by the team after posting MLB-leading 5 wins, 2.56 ERA (8th in AL), 0.85 WHIP (2nd), 0.177 BAA and 0.470 OPS (both lead AL) in April. On June 9, 2019, German was put on the 10-day injured list due to a hip strain. He was activated on July 3, 2019. In his first start back from the IL, German allowed a home run by Jeff McNeil on the first pitch, but it was the only run he allowed in 6 innings as the Yankees won 5-1 against the New York Mets.

On September 19, 2019, Germán was placed on administrative leave by MLB, pending an investigation of suspected domestic violence. On September 25, it was confirmed that he would not be eligible to participate in any baseball action for the remainder of 2019, including the postseason. He had the best win–loss percentage of MLB pitchers in 2019, at .818.

On January 2, 2020, Germán was suspended for the first 63 games of 2020, making his punishment for 81 games including time served in 2019 due to violating the league's personal conduct policy, the harshest suspension levied to a player on domestic violence allegations, but not formally charged. He was also eligible to return on 2020 postseason, as most of his suspension was served during the 2019 postseason.

Following a 4–0 loss against the Tampa Bay Rays, the Yankees optioned Germán to the alternative site on April 10, 2021. Against the Red Sox on July 25, 2021, Germán took a no-hitter through seven innings until a lead-off double by Alex Verdugo ended the chance. The Yankees would lose 5–4 due to a faltering bullpen. Germán finished the 2021 season with a 4–5 record and a 4.58 ERA.

Germán began the 2022 season on the 60-day injured list due to right shoulder impingement syndrome. He returned on July 21, 2022, making the start against the Houston Astros. During his return, Germán allowed 5 runs in 3 innings.

Personal life
Germán is of Dominican nationality, with Haitian ancestry.

In September 2019, Germán and his girlfriend attended a charity gala held by then-teammate CC Sabathia. Many of Germán’s 2019 teammates were also there with their families. Sources said Germán slapped his girlfriend at the event, but the MLB investigation focused primarily on what happened at his home later that night. According to multiple league sources, including a person with knowledge of the MLB investigation, Germán was intoxicated and became physically violent toward his girlfriend until she hid in a locked room. She reportedly contacted the wife of one of Germán's teammates, and the couple drove to Germán’s home late at night. She remained with the teammate’s wife while the player attempted to calm down Germán, who is said to have been angry and belligerent. The incident was reported to MLB by a different member of the Yankees staff, whom Germán’s girlfriend had told about it. She did not call law enforcement.

References

External links

 Domingo German stats MiLB.com

 

1992 births
Batavia Muckdogs players
Charleston RiverDogs players
Dominican Republic expatriate baseball players in the United States
Dominican Republic people of Haitian descent
Dominican Summer League Marlins players
Greensboro Grasshoppers players
Gulf Coast Marlins players

Living people
Major League Baseball pitchers
Major League Baseball players from the Dominican Republic
New York Yankees players
Sportspeople from San Pedro de Macorís
Scranton/Wilkes-Barre RailRiders players
Tampa Yankees players
Trenton Thunder players
Tampa Tarpons players
Toros del Este players